Mackin is a surname of multiple origins in the British Isles. 

In Scotland, it originates from the west coast and the Hebrides as MacKin, from the Gaelic Mac Sim or Mac Shimidh meaning "son of Simon". 

In Wales, Mackin is thought to be derived from the village of Machen in Monmouthshire. 

In Ireland, Mackin was the County Monaghan spelling of MacMaicin, a sept from the Kingdom of Oriel.

People with this name

Alan Mackin (footballer), Scottish footballer, entrepreneur, and football club owner
Alan Mackin (tennis) (born 1981), Scottish tennis player
Cassie Mackin, American journalist
Edward Mackin, a pseudonym of the American religious scholar and fiction writer Ralph McInerny
James Mackin, American banker
John Mackin, Scottish footballer and manager
Levi Mackin, English footballer
Peter Mackin (1878–1917), English footballer
Sean Mackin (musician), violinist and backing vocalist for Yellowcard

References